Paspalidium caespitosum, commonly known as Brigalow grass, is a species of grass in the family Poaceae native to inland eastern Australia, where it is found in the Brigalow Belt.

References

Panicoideae
Plants described in 1934
Flora of Queensland